Zhang Huiwen (born 13 September 1993) is a Chinese actress. She received widespread media attention after debuting in Zhang Yimou's film Coming Home (2014), and is also noted for her roles in Nirvana in Fire 2, The Flaming Heart and Legend of Fei.

Early life and education 
Zhang Huiwen was born on 13 September, 1993 in Yingtan, Jiangxi, China. From 2007–2010, she studied at the No.1 Middle School in Yingtan City, Jiangxi Province. In 2010, Zhang was admitted to Beijing Dance Academy, China's leading dance institution, and graduated in 2014 with a degree in Chinese folk dance.

Career

2013–2016: Beginnings
In March 2013, while a student at the Beijing Dance Academy, Zhang was discovered by renowned film director Zhang Yimou, who hand-picked her for the role of "Dan Dan" in Coming Home due to her excellent dancing skills. Before the official filming, Zhang went to the National Ballet of China to receive special ballet training for two months, and her dance performance was also affirmed by the media.

On May 16, 2014, the film Coming Home was released nationwide. On the first day it was released, it broke the box office record for the first day of a literary film with a record of 30 million yuan. In the end, the film received nearly 300 million yuan in mainland China, breaking the box office record for Chinese domestic literary films on the release day, the speed of breaking 100 million yuan, the total number of days of release, and the total number of box offices. Zhang was highly praised for her performance, and received four Best Newcomer awards at the 9th Asian Film Awards, 6th Macau International Film Festival, 22nd Beijing College Student Film Festival and 9th Chinese Youth Video Forum. Following the success of Coming Home, Zhang (Yimou girl) frequently appeared in major fashion magazines and fashion events, becoming the new darling of the fashion industry.

In 2015, Zhang starred in the coming-of-age youth film Forever Young by He Jiong in his directorial debut. The film made US$38.5 million in its three-day opening weekend in China, debuting at first place at the Chinese box office and third worldwide behind Minions and Terminator Genisys.

In 2016, Zhang appeared in the Hong Kong police film Line Walker. The same year, Zhang starred in the youth romance film Crying Out in Love, based on Kyoichi Katayama's 2004 novel Socrates in Love.

2017–present: Rising popularity 
In 2017, Zhang made her small-screen debut in the historical wuxia drama Nirvana in Fire 2, the sequel to the critically acclaimed drama Nirvana in Fire. The series earned a Douban score of 8.5 from more than 144,766 user reviews, and led to increased recognition for Zhang.

In 2019, Zhang starred in the fantasy detective film The Great Detective, and was included as one of the 32 actors in the China Movie Channel Young Actors Project.

In 2020, Zhang starred in the wuxia romance drama Love a Lifetime, and gained attention for her supporting role in the wuxia drama Legend of Fei.

In 2021, Zhang starred in the comedy film Overall Planning, followed by the commemoration anthology series Faith Makes Great. The same year, Zhang starred in the emergency rescue drama The Flaming Heart, historical slice of life drama Marvelous Women and detective romance drama Heart of Loyalty.

Social activities 
On May 21, 2014, Zhang joined the charity "Dandelion" project at the 67th Cannes International Film Festival's media meeting ceremony, signed on the spot to support the "Dandelion" Poor Girl Dream Project, and recorded a video call to call on more people to pay attention to the education of children in poverty.

Filmography

Film

Television series

Short film

Television show

Discography

Other activities

Endorsements

Awards and nominations

References

External links 

1993 births
Living people
21st-century Chinese actresses
Chinese film actresses
Chinese television actresses
Actresses from Jiangxi
Chinese female dancers
Beijing Dance Academy alumni
Best Newcomer Asian Film Award winners